Ilse is a common female name, technically a German diminutive of Elisabeth, functioning as a given name in its own right chiefly in Austria, Belgium, Germany, the Netherlands, Switzerland and all of the Scandinavian countries including Finland. It may refer to:

Rivers
 Ilse (Bega), a river of North Rhine-Westphalia, Germany, tributary of the Bega
 Ilse (Lahn), a river of North Rhine-Westphalia, Germany, tributary of the Lahn
 Ilse (Oker), a river of Lower Saxony and Saxony-Anhalt, Germany, flowing from the Harz mountains, tributary of the Oker
 Ilse (Weser), a river in Lower Saxony, Germany

People
 Princess Ilse, a legendary princess of the Harz mountains in Germany
 Ilse Aichinger (1921–2016), Austrian writer
 Ilse Everlien Berardo (born 1955), German Lutheran theologian, responsible for the German-speaking Protestant Church on Madeira Island
 Ilse Bing (1899–1998), German avant-garde photographer
 Ilse Braun (1909–1979), one of two sisters of Eva Braun
 Ilse DeLange (born 1977), Dutch singer
 Ilse Dörffeldt (1912–1992), German Olympic sprinter
 Ilse Fischer (born 1975), Austrian mathematician
 Ilse Fürstenberg (1907–1976), German actress
 Ilse Geldhof (born 1973), Belgian racing cyclist
 Ilse Gradwohl (born 1943), Mexican painter
 Ilse Hellman (1908–1998), Austrian-British psychoanalyst
 Ilse Heylen (born 1977), Belgian judoka
 Ilse Kaschube (born 1953), East German sprint canoer who competed in the early 1970s
 Ilse Koch, one of the first prominent Nazis to be tried by the U.S. military
 Ilse María Olivo Schweinfurth (born 1965), Venezuelan-born Mexican singer and telenovela actress, stage name
 Ilse Thiele (1920–2010), East German politician
 Ilse Vaessen (born 1986), Dutch badminton player
 Ilse van der Meijden (born 1988), water polo player of the Netherlands
 Ilse Werner (1921–2005), Dutch actress and singer

Characters
 Ilse Burnley, a major character in the Emily of New Moon trilogy and its adaptations.
 Ilse Langnar, a character from the Attack on Titan manga.
 Ilse Neumann, character in the play Spring Awakening, and later adaptations
 Ilse Witch, character in several books of the Shannara series

Other
 249 Ilse, an asteroid named for the legendary German princess of the Harz Mountains
Aechmea 'Ilse', a plant

See also

Else (disambiguation)
ILSE (disambiguation)
Ilze, a given name

Dutch feminine given names
Estonian feminine given names
German feminine given names